Taigum is a northern suburb in the City of Brisbane, Queensland, Australia.

Geography
The suburb is bounded to the west and north by Cabbage Tree Creek, to the east by Muller Road, and to the south by Beams Road.

History
The Tighgum area (now known as Taigum) was first developed around 1853, as part of a subdivision of the Nundah Division. In 1891, it was suggested, unsuccessfully, by the board that the name be changed to "Tyghum Divisional Board" and Tighgum Creek was also the original and alternate name in brackets for Cabbage tree Creek.

The name is derived from an Aboriginal word for lawyer cane. The word Taghum was used as alternative to cabbage in Cabbage Tree Creek.

Zillmere North State School opened on 29 January 1957 on a  site. In 1993, it was renamed Taigum State School.

Taigum Square shopping centre opened in 1982 and was expanded in 2001.

It was named after Paraskevi of Rome. It serves as home to the Taigum Child Care Centre.

The median age of the Taigum population was 39 years, 2 years above the Australian median. 65.9% of people living in Taigum were born in Australia, compared to the national average of 69.8%; the next most common countries of birth were New Zealand 5.2%, Philippines 3.8%, England 3.7%, India 3.2%, Fiji 1.2%. 78.1% of people spoke only English at home; the next most common languages were 2.1% Tagalog, 1.5% Punjabi, 1.2% Filipino, 1.1% Hindi, 1.1% Italian. Over 38% of households in this area were couples with children, 40% were of couples without children and 18% were single parent households. Over 61% of residential developments were houses and another 25% were townhouses.

The building formerly belonged to the iSee Church.

Education 
Taigum State School is a government primary (Early Childhood-6) school for boys and girls at 266 Handford Road. In 2018, the school had an enrolment of 406 students with 35 teachers (30 full-time equivalent) and 28 non-teaching staff (15 full-time equivalent). It includes a special education program.

There are no secondary schools in Taigum. The nearest government secondary schools are Sandgate District State High School in neighbouring Deagon to the north and Aspley State High School in Aspley to the south-west.

Amenities 

Taigum Square shopping centre is at 217 Beams Road.

Centrepoint Church is at 203 Beams Road. It is part of the Australian Christian Churches network.

St Paraskevi Greek Orthodox Church is at 241 Church Road. It is a parish of the Greek Orthodox Archdiocese of Australia, part of the Ecumenical Patriarchate of Constantinople.

References

External links